Baños de Río Tobía is a village of La Rioja, in Spain. Located near the Najerilla river, in 2021 it had a population of 1,583 inhabitants. Its Chorizo, wood and plywood industry is notable.

Places of Interest 

 Town Hall: 16th century.
 Salazar´s Palace: 17th century.
 Church of Saint Pelagius: 16th century.
 Hermitage of the Rosary: 17th century.
 Hermitage of the Virgin of Los Parrales. South of the town center.

Feasts and festivals 
Its main festivals are held from September 20 to 24, in honor of San Mateo and La Virgen de Los Parrales. On the Sunday before September 21, the Chorizo Festival is celebrated, during which chorizo is distributed among the thousands of attendees and the pig is slaughtered in its traditional way. In February, the "quintos" celebrate their party.

Mayors

Notable people 
 Juan Jose Garcia Failde judge of the Roman Rota
 Eduardo Martínez Somalo (1927–2021): Cardinal of the Roman Catholic Church and Camerlengo of the Pope until 2007.
 Abel San Martín "Barberito I" (1927–1980): Pelotari Spanish champion in the individual category.
 Domingo Salazar (1525–1594): Archbishop de Manila.
 Benito Ignacio de Salazar (1615–1692) Bishop of Barcelona and president of the General Deputation of Catalonia between (1689–1692).

Sports 
Baños de Río Tobía has a soccer team, the Club Deportivo Bañuelos, founded in 1982, this club competes in Regional Preferente de Rioja. They dress in full red, with white details. The CD Bañuelos played 2 seasons in the Tercera División.

Annually, on the last Saturday of April, there is a night walk of about 63 km (39 miles) that goes from Logroño to the Monastery of Nuestra Señora de Valvanera, this night walk is known as La Valvanerada. The town collaborates in its organization by distributing supplies with a chocolate bar and carrying out controls. 
An amateur Mano pelota championship takes place during the summer, bringing together numerous competitors from different categories. "The day of the bicycle" is another sports activity, organized in June, a march takes place around the town, attended by a good part of its inhabitants.

References

External links 
 Official website 

Municipalities in La Rioja (Spain)